Luboń is a town in Greater Poland Voivodeship (west-central Poland).

Luboń may also refer to the following villages:
Luboń, Pomeranian Voivodeship (north Poland)
Luboń, West Pomeranian Voivodeship (north-west Poland)